Gerald Caiafa Jr. (born April 21, 1959), better known by his stage name Jerry Only, is an American musician, best known as the bassist for the Misfits and later the vocalist as well. He is the only member to appear in every Misfits lineup.

Biography

Misfits

Gerald Caiafa Jr. was born in Lodi, New Jersey. He started The Misfits with Glenn Danzig on vocals and Manny on drums in 1977, just a few months after receiving his first bass as a late Christmas present. He would work at his father's machine shop during the week to help finance the band and play shows on the weekend. This would go on for several years and the band split due to differences between Danzig and the rest of the band. During this downtime, Only and his brother Doyle Wolfgang von Frankenstein (the guitarist for the Misfits) formed Kryst The Conqueror. In 1995, Only settled a legal battle out of court with co-founder Glenn Danzig, allowing him rights to the Misfits' name on a performing level, while they split the money on merchandising. He reformed the band with Doyle (who played guitar from 1980 to 1983), vocalist Michale Graves, and drummer Dr. Chud.

Chud and Graves left the group in 2000 to form Graves. In reaction to the loss of members, Doyle left the Misfits. Graves, Doyle and Chud were replaced on the M25 tour by Dez Cadena, formerly of Black Flag and DC3, on guitar and Marky Ramone, formerly of The Ramones, on drums. Only took up the singing duties from this point till the present date. In early 2005, Marky left the group and Only brought in ex-Misfit and Black Flag drummer ROBO to rejoin the group. A new album was recorded in 2010 in Colorado entitled The Devil's Rain which was released in October 2011. A single, "Land of the Dead", was released at the mischief night show 2009 at Starland Ballroom in Sayreville, NJ.

In 2013, Only and the Misfits released a new album entitled DEAD ALIVE! recorded live at several shows.

In 2017, the reunited lineup performed two additional concerts at the MGM Grand Garden Arena in Las Vegas on December 28 and The Forum in Inglewood, California on December 30. They also performed at the Prudential Center in Newark, New Jersey on May 19, 2018.

World Championship Wrestling
In 1999, Only and the rest of the then Misfits lineup had a brief stint in World Championship Wrestling when they aligned with wrestler Vampiro. Only participated in probably the most memorable match of the Misfits' time when he fought Dr. Death in a steel cage match. Only was dominated in the match but Death was distracted when the rest of the Misfits interfered and attacked his manager Oklahoma (a parody of Jim Ross), pouring barbecue sauce in his eyes. Only won the match after being accidentally Irish whipped through the cage door by Dr. Death.

Only/Danzig lawsuit
On May 6, 2014, it was announced that Glenn Danzig had filed a lawsuit against Jerry Only, claiming Only registered trademarks for everything Misfits-related in 2000 behind Danzig's back, misappropriating exclusive ownership over the trademarks for himself, including the band's iconic "Crimson Ghost" logo. Danzig claims that this violated a 1994 contract the two had. Danzig says that after registering the trademarks, Only secretly entered into deals with various merchandisers and cut him out of any potential profits in the process. He said that Only has purposefully led merchandisers, including Hot Topic, to believe that they are legally bound not to accept licenses to exploit the Marks from Danzig or his designees, and Only continues to do so. He said that through this, Only has caused merchandisers not to do business with him and it has deceived consumers as to the source of the merchandise which bore the trademarks. Danzig said a vast majority of the Misfits fans associate the trademarks with the 1977–1983 classic Misfits era when Danzig was a member of the band and not with the current era Misfits. Danzig feels that through false advertising and misrepresentations to merchandisers and consumers it has caused him to suffer damages in excess of $75,000. In August 2014, the judge dismissed the case in favor of Only. In 2017, Darkride Films Interview original drummer Manny Martinez said that from what he remembers, there was no Diane Dipiazza or Jimi Battle in the band. Before The Misfits, Mr. Jim, Diane, and Jimi played in a band with Glenn doing covers, but the original Misfits were Glenn Danzig, Manny Martinez, Jerry Only, and Franche Coma.

Discography

The Misfits
Static Age (1978)
12 Hits from Hell (1980)
Walk Among Us (1982)
Earth A.D./Wolfs Blood (1983)
Evilive (1983)
Legacy of Brutality (1985)
Misfits (1986)
Collection II (1995)
American Psycho (1997)
Evilive II (1998)
Famous Monsters (1999)
Cuts from the Crypt (2001)
Project 1950 (2003)
The Devil's Rain (2011)
Dead Alive! (2013)
Vampire Girl (2015)
Friday the 13th (2016)

Kryst the Conqueror
Deliver Us from Evil (1989)

Osaka Popstar
Osaka Popstar and the American Legends of Punk (2006)

Solo
Anti-Hero (2022)

Filmography
Vampira: The Movie (2006)
KISS Loves You (2004)
Fans and Freaks: The Culture of Comics and Conventions (2002)
Campfire Stories (2001)
The Big Brother Video: Crap (2001)
 Bruiser (2000)
Big Money Hustlas (1999)
Animal Room (1995)

TV

Biography (2010)The X Show (2000)Mayhem (1999)WCW Monday Nitro'' (1999)

References

External links

American heavy metal singers
American punk rock bass guitarists
American punk rock singers
American male singers
American heavy metal bass guitarists
American male bass guitarists
Horror punk musicians
Misfits (band) members
1959 births
Living people
Singers from New Jersey
People from Lodi, New Jersey
American people of Italian descent
Guitarists from New Jersey
American male guitarists
20th-century American guitarists